Mark Weedon may refer to:
 Mark Weedon (cricketer)
 Mark Weedon (rugby union)